Īter-pīša, inscribed in cuneiform as i-te-er-pi/pi4-ša and meaning "Her command is surpassing", ca. 1769–1767 BC (short chronology) or ca. 1833–1831 BC (middle chronology), was the 12th king of Isin during the Old Babylonian period. The Sumerian King List tells us that "the divine Īter-pīša ruled for 4 years." The Ur-Isin King List which was written in the 4th year of the reign of Damiq-ilišu gives a reign of just 3 years. His relationships with his predecessor and successor are uncertain and his reign falls during a period of general decline in the fortunes of the dynasty.

Biography

He was a contemporary of Warad-Sin (ca. 1770 BC to 1758 BC) the king of Larsa, whose brother and successor, Rim-Sin I would eventually come to overthrow the dynasty, ending the cities' bitter rivalry around 40 years later. He is only known from Kings lists and year-name date formulae in several contemporary legal and administrative texts. Two of his year-names refer to his provision of a copper Lilis for Utu and Inanna respectively, where Lilissu is a kettledrum used in temple rituals.

He is perhaps best known for the literary work generally known as the letter from Nabi-Enlil to Īter-pīša formerly designated letter from Īter-pīša to a deity, when its contents were less well understood. It is extant in seven fragmentary manuscripts and seems to be a petition to the king from a subject who has fallen on hard times. It is a 24-line composition that had become a belle letter used in scribal education during the subsequent Old Babylonian period.

Inscriptions

Notes

External links
 Īter-pīša year-names at CDLI, but note the tablet reference BM 85384 in year-name (b) is incorrect.

References

19th-century BC Sumerian kings
18th-century BC Sumerian kings
Dynasty of Isin